Kruttika Nadig (born 17 February 1988) is a chess player from Maharashtra, India. She holds the title of Woman Grandmaster (WGM) and won the Indian national women's championship in 2008. Nadig competed in the Women's World Chess Championship 2010; she was knocked out in the first round by compatriot Harika Dronavalli. She played for India in the Women's World Team Chess Championship and Women's Asian Team Chess Championship in 2009, and for India women's team in the World Youth U16 Chess Olympiad in 2003.

She is also a journalist.

References

External links

1988 births
Living people
Indian female chess players
Chess woman grandmasters
Place of birth missing (living people)
Sportswomen from Maharashtra
21st-century Indian women
21st-century Indian people